Anne-Marie Aaröe (born 20 May 1925), also known as Ami Aaröe or Amy Aaröe, is a Swedish actress who appeared during the classic cinema era.

Biography 
Aaröe was born on 20 May 1925 in Stockholm, Sweden. She is the daughter of captain Arvid Aaröe and his wife Hjördis, née Ström. Ami made her film debut in Hasse Ekman's film Ombyte av tåg, which was filmed in 1942 and premiered in 1943. She had her first speaking role at theatre as Titania in A Midsummer Night's Dream in 1945. Alongside the acting profession, she has been the director of the film company Starfilm.

Aaröe made other appearances in other films like ...och efter skymning kommer mörker (1947), A Ship to India (1947), Love, Sunshine and Songs (1948) and Le Silence de la Mer (1949).

Personal life 
Ami was married to the French dancer and graduate engineer Guy Patrick Delmas in 1955 and they had a daughter who was born in Paris. After her husband death she resides in her villa in Tulegatan, Stockholm.

Filmography 
 The Nuthouse (1951)
 Le Silence de la Mer (1949) - La fiancée
 Love, Sunshine and Songs (1948) - Britt
 A Ship to India (1947) - Young Girl at the beach
 ...och efter skymning kommer mörker (1947)
 Ombyte av tåg (1943) - Aina

References 

1925 births
Possibly living people
Swedish film actresses
Swedish stage actresses
Swedish film directors
Actresses from Stockholm